Barry Mann (born Barry Imberman; February 9, 1939) is an American songwriter and musician, and part of a successful songwriting partnership with his wife, Cynthia Weil.

He has written or co-written 53 hits in the UK and 98 in the US.

Early life
Mann was born to a Jewish family in Brooklyn, New York City, United States. He was born two days before fellow songwriter Gerry Goffin.

Career
His first successful song as a writer was "She Say (Oom Dooby Doom)", a Top 20 chart-scoring song composed for the band The Diamonds in 1959. Mann co-wrote the song with Mike Anthony (Michael Logiudice). In 1961, Mann had his greatest success to that point with "I Love How You Love Me", written with Larry Kolber and a no. 5 scoring single for the band The Paris Sisters (seven years later, Bobby Vinton's version would reach the Top 10). The same year, Mann himself reached the Top 40 as a performer with a novelty song co-written with Gerry Goffin, "Who Put the Bomp", which parodied the nonsense words of the then-popular doo-wop genre.

Despite his success as a singer, Mann chose to channel his creativity into songwriting, forming a prolific partnership with Weil, a lyricist he met while both were staff songwriters at Don Kirshner and Al Nevin's company Aldon Music, whose offices were located in Manhattan, near the composing-and-publishing factory the Brill Building. Mann and Weil, who married in 1961, developed some songs intended to be socially conscious, with successes such as "Uptown" by The Crystals, "We Gotta Get out of This Place" by the Animals, "Magic Town" by The Vogues, and "Kicks" by Paul Revere & the Raiders. Mann and Weil were disturbed when "Only In America", a song they had written with the team of Jerry Leiber and Mike Stoller and conceived originally for and recorded by the Drifters as a protest against racial prejudice, was re-worked by Leiber and Stoller into an uncontroversial success for Jay & The Americans.

, Mann's song catalog lists 635 songs. He has received 56 popular music, country, and Rhythm & Blues awards from Broadcast Music Inc., and 46 Millionaire Awards for radio performances numbering more than one million plays. The song "You've Lost That Lovin' Feelin'", co-written with Weil and Phil Spector, was the most played song of the 20th century, with more than 14 million plays.

Mann has composed songs for movies, most notably "Somewhere Out There", co-written with Weil and James Horner, for the 1986 animated movie An American Tail. Linda Ronstadt and James Ingram performed the song as a duet during the movie's closing credits; their version was released as a single, which scored No. 2 on the Billboard chart and became a "gold"-scoring record. "Somewhere Out There" would win two 1987 Grammy Awards, as Song of the Year and Best Song Written for a Motion Picture or Television. "Somewhere Out There" was also nominated for a 1986 Oscar as best song, but lost to "Take My Breath Away" from Top Gun (a film that featured the Weil-penned "You've Lost That Lovin' Feelin'" in a key scene). Mann's other movie work includes the scores for I Never Sang for My Father and Muppet Treasure Island, and songs for National Lampoon's Christmas Vacation and Oliver & Company.

Mann co-wrote, with Dan Hill, the song "Sometimes When We Touch," which scored No. 3 on the Billboard Hot 100.

In 1987, Mann and Weil were inducted into the Songwriters Hall of Fame. In 2011, they received the Johnny Mercer Award, the greatest honor from the Songwriters Hall of Fame.

Mann and Weil were named among the 2010 recipients of Ahmet Ertegun Award from the Rock and Roll Hall of Fame. Mann and Weil now operate a publishing company named Dyad Music.

Personal life
Mann married Cynthia Weil in August 1961. They have one daughter, Jenn. They reside in Beverly Hills, California.

Songs written by Barry Mann and Cynthia Weil

"Absolutely Green" – Dom DeLuise (written for Cynthia Weil for A Troll in Central Park
"Angelica" - Scott Walker 
"Another Goodbye" – Donna Fargo (co-written with Scott English)
"Black Butterfly" – Deniece Williams
"Blame It on the Bossa Nova" – Eydie Gorme
"Bless You" - Tony Orlando
"Brown Eyed Woman" – Bill Medley
"Christmas Vacation" – film title song
"Coldest Night of the Year" – Twice As Much featuring Vashti Bunyan.
"Don't Know Much" – Aaron Neville and Linda Ronstadt (written with Tom Snow)
"Don't Make My Baby Blue" – Frankie Laine, The Shadows, The Move
"Good Time Living" – Three Dog Night
"Heart" – Kenny Chandler, Wayne Newton
"Here You Come Again" – Dolly Parton
"He's Sure the Boy I Love" – The Crystals
"How Can I Tell Her It's Over" – Andy Williams
"Hungry" – Paul Revere & the Raiders
"I Just Can't Help Believing" – B. J. Thomas, Elvis Presley
"I'm a Survivor" - Jon English
"I'm Gonna Be Strong" – Gene Pitney; Cyndi Lauper
"It's Getting Better" – Cass Elliot
"It's Not Easy" – Normie Rowe, Will-O-Bees, Colin Blunstone (as Neil MacArthur)
"I Will Come to You" – Hanson
"Just a Little Lovin' (Early in the Morning)" – Sarah Vaughan, Dusty Springfield, Carmen McRae, Billy Eckstine, Bobby Vinton, Shelby Lynne
"Just Once" – James Ingram with Quincy Jones
"Kicks" – Paul Revere & the Raiders
"Looking Through the Eyes of Love" – Gene Pitney, Marlena Shaw, The Fortunes, The Partridge Family
"Love Her" - The Everly Brothers, The Walker Brothers
"Love Led Us Here" – John Berry, Helen Darling
"Magic Town" – The Vogues
"Make Your Own Kind of Music" – "Mama" Cass Elliot
"Never Gonna Let You Go" – Sérgio Mendes
"New World Coming" - Mama Cass
"None of Us Are Free" (Mann, Weil, Brenda Russell) – Ray Charles, Lynyrd Skynyrd, Solomon Burke
"On Broadway" – The Drifters, George Benson (written with Jerry Leiber and Mike Stoller)
"Once Upon a Time in New York City" – (written with Howard Ashman for Oliver & Company)
"Only in America" – Jay and the Americans
"Proud" – Johnny Crawford
"Rock and Roll Lullaby" – B. J. Thomas
"Saturday Night at the Movies" – The Drifters
"Shades of Gray" and "Love is Only Sleeping" – The Monkees
"Shape of Things to Come" – Max Frost and the Troopers
"She's Over Me" – Teddy Pendergrass
"Something Better" – Marianne Faithfull (written with Gerry Goffin)
"Somewhere Out There" – Linda Ronstadt and James Ingram (written with James Horner for the animated film An American Tail) – a double Grammy Award winner.
"Sweet Sorrow" – Conway Twitty
"Teenage Has-Been" - Barry Mann, (written with Gerry Goffin)
"Too Many Mondays" – Barry Mann, Wicked Lester (unreleased)
"Uptown" – The Crystals
"Walking in the Rain" – The Ronettes, The Walker Brothers, Jay and the Americans, The Partridge Family (written with Phil Spector)
"We Gotta Get out of This Place" – The Animals
"We're Over" – Johnny Rodriguez
"Whatever You Imagine" - Wendy Moten (written with James Horner for the live-action/animated film The Pagemaster)
"Where have you been (all my life)" - Arthur Alexander also played by Gene Vincent, The Beatles and by Gerry and the Pacemakers
"Who Put the Bomp (in the Bomp, Bomp, Bomp) - Barry Mann (written with Gerry Goffin)
"A World of Our Own" – Closing theme song from Return to the Blue Lagoon – Surface
"(You're My) Soul and Inspiration" – The Righteous Brothers
"You've Lost That Lovin' Feelin'" – The Righteous Brothers (written with Phil Spector)

Awards
Grammy Award for Best Song Written for a Motion Picture, Television or Other Visual Media
Grammy Award for Song of the Year
Academy Award for Best Original Song

References

External links
Barry Mann and Cynthia Weil Official website

1939 births
Living people
People from Beverly Hills, California
Songwriters from New York (state)
Musicians from Brooklyn
Grammy Award winners
Jewish American songwriters
Songwriters from California
21st-century American Jews